Spinach salad is a salad with spinach as its main ingredient. Common additional ingredients include tomatoes, eggs, cheese, slivered almonds, walnuts and/or fresh or dried berries, such as cranberry, or strawberry.

Spinach salad is classically served with a warm bacon or vinaigrette dressing, but variations are endless.

See also
 Spinach soup
 List of salads

References

Salads
Spinach dishes